Lakshmi Narasimha Malla (also spelled Lakshminarasimha or Laxminarasimha) was a Malla ruler and the seventh king of Kantipur. He was the youngest son of Harihara Simha and succeeded his grandfather Shivasimha Malla in 1619 as the King of Kantipur.

Reign 
The reign of Lakshminarasimha started when his grandfather Shivasimha Malla died in 1619. Kantipur had annexed Patan in the time of Shivasimha Malla but after his death, Siddhi Narasimha Malla declared Patan independent and hence Laxminarasimha only ruled the Kantipur.

Lakshminarasimha had a Kaji (minister) named Bhima Malla. Bhima Malla was sent to Tibet to negotiate a trade treaty. He succeeded in concluding a favorable treaty to Kantipur but after his return, other ministers conspired and accused him of trying to replace the King. The conspirators were successful, and Bhima Malla was sent to death. The then tradition dictated that his wife be burnt along in her husband's pyre (Sati). It is said that she, about to be burnt, cursed the entire country. Due to that event, Nepal is also called Sati le sarapeko desh (land cursed by Sati).

Soon afterwards, the King realized his mistake of sentencing Bhima Malla to death. It greatly depressed him and later on he went insane. He was imprisoned by his son Pratap Malla under the grounds of insanity who ruled Kantipur until 1674.

References

Notes

Sources 

Malla rulers of Kantipur
Year of birth unknown
17th-century Nepalese people
Nepalese monarchs